A personal union is the combination of two or more states that have the same monarch while their boundaries, laws, and interests remain distinct. A real union, by contrast, would involve the constituent states being to some extent interlinked, such as by sharing some limited governmental institutions. Unlike the personal union, in a federation and a unitary state, a central (federal) government spanning all member states exists, with the degree of self-governance distinguishing the two. The ruler in a personal union does not need to be a hereditary monarch.

The term was coined by German jurist Johann Stephan Pütter, introducing it into Elementa iuris publici germanici (Elements of German Public Law) of 1760.

Personal unions can arise for several reasons, such as:
 inheritance through a dynastic union, e.g. Louis X of France inherited France from his father and Navarre from his mother
 decolonization, ex-colonies install the monarch of the former colonizing power as their own upon becoming independent
 autonomization, e.g. instead of annexing Finland into the Russian Empire, Alexander I of Russia prompted to organize his conquest as a new state and act as its head of state

They can also be codified (i.e., the constitutions of the states clearly express that they shall share the same person as head of state) or non-codified, in which case they can easily be broken (e.g., by the death of the monarch when the two states have different succession laws).

The concept of personal union has almost never crossed over from monarchies into republics, but there have been exceptions.

Monarchies in personal union

Africa

Congo Free State and Belgium
Personal union with Belgium from 1885 to 1908, when the Congo Free State became a Belgian colony. The only sovereign during this period was Leopold II, who continued as king of Belgium until his death a year later in 1909.

Americas

Brazil
 Personal union with Portugal, under Pedro I of Brazil (Pedro IV of Portugal), from 10 March to 28 May 1826. Pedro was the Prince Royal of Portugal, Brazil and the Algarves when he declared the independence of Brazil in 1822, becoming its first emperor. When his father (John VI of Portugal) died, Pedro also became King of Portugal, but abdicated the Portuguese throne 79 days later in favour of his older child Princess Maria da Glória.

Asia

Goryeo
 Personal union with Shenyang in the Mongol-led Yuan dynasty of China (1308–1313; King Chungseon)
 As King of Goryeo (高麗國王) and King of Shenyang (瀋陽王) in 1308–1310
 As King of Goryeo and King of Shen (瀋王) in 1310–1313

King Chungseon reigned as King of Goryeo in 1298 and 1308–1313 and as King of Shenyang or King of Shen from 1307 (according to the History of Yuan) or 1308 (according to Goryeosa) to 1316. At that time, Goryeo had already become a vassal of Yuan dynasty and the Yuan imperial family and the Goryeo royal family had close relationship by marriages of convenience. Because he was a very powerful man during Emperor Wuzong's reign, he could become the King of Shenyang where many Korean people lived in China. However, he lost his power in the Yuan imperial court after the death of the Emperor Wuzong. Because the Yuan dynasty made Chungseon abdicate the crown of the Goryeo in 1313, the personal union was ended. King Chungsuk, Chungseon's eldest son, became the new King of Goryeo. In 1316, the Yuan dynasty made Chungseon abdicate the crown of Shen in favour of Wang Go, one of his nephews, resulting in him becoming the new King of Shen.

Europe

Albania
 Medieval Albanian Kingdom personal union with the Kingdom of Naples (1272–1368)
Personal union with Kingdom of Italy (1939–1943).

Andorra
Even though France is now a republic with a president and not a monarchy, it has nevertheless been in personal union with the neighbouring nominal monarchy (non-hereditary) of Andorra since 1278.

Austria
 Personal union with Lands of the Bohemian Crown (1260–1276, 1306–1307, 1438–1439, 1453–1457, and 1526–1918). 
 Personal union with Lands of the Hungarian Crown (1437–1439, 1444–1457, and 1526–1918).
 Personal union with Austrian Netherlands (1714–1795).
 Personal union with Spanish Empire (1519–1521). 
 Personal union with Kingdom of Naples (1714–1735), Kingdom of Sardinia (1714–1720), Kingdom of Sicily (1720–1735), Duchy of Parma (1735–1748), Venetia (1797–1805) and Kingdom of Lombardy–Venetia (1814–1859)
 Personal union with Kingdom of Slavonia (1699–1868), Kingdom of Serbia (1718–1739), Kingdom of Galicia and Lodomeria (1772–1918), Duchy of Bukovina (1774–1918), New Galicia (1795–1809), Kingdom of Dalmatia (1797–1805 and 1814–1918) and Bosnia and Herzegovina (1878/1908–1918).

Bohemia
 Personal union with Poland 1003–1004 (Bohemia occupied by Poles)
 Personal union with Poland 1300–1306 and Hungary 1301–1305 (Wenceslas II and Wenceslas III)
 Personal union with Luxembourg 1313–1378 and 1383–1388
 Personal union with Hungary 1419–1439 (Sigismund of Luxemburg and his son in law) and 1490–1526 (Jagellon dynasty)
 Personal union with Austria and Hungary 1526–1918 (except years 1619–1620)

Brandenburg
 Personal union with the Principality of Ansbach from 1415 to 1440 and 1470 to 1486.
 Personal union with the Duchy of Prussia from 1618, when Albert Frederick, Duke of Prussia, died without male heirs and his son-in-law John Sigismund, Elector of Brandenburg, became ruler of both countries. Brandenburg and Prussia maintained separate governments and seats of power in Berlin and Königsberg respectively until 1701, when Frederick I consolidated them into one government.

Croatia

 Personal union with the Kingdom of Hungary 1102–1918

Denmark
 Personal union with Norway (986–995, 1000–1014, 1028–1035, 1042–1047, 1380–1397, 1397–1523 (Kalmar Union) and 1524–1814 (Denmark–Norway)).
 Personal union with England (1013–1014, 1018–1035 (North Sea Empire) and 1040–1042).
 Personal union with Sweden (1397–1523 (Kalmar Union)).
 Personal union with Duchy of Schleswig (1086–1364, 1460–1864) and County/Duchy of Holstein (1460–1864).
 Personal union with County of Oldenburg (1667–1773)
 Personal union with Duchy of Saxe-Lauenburg (1814–1864)
 Personal union with Iceland (1918–1944).

England
 Personal union, as Kingdom of England, with Denmark (1013–1014, 1018–1035 (North Sea Empire) and 1040–1042).
 Personal union, as Kingdom of England, with Duchy of Normandy (1066–1087, 1106–1144, 1154–1204/1259).
 Personal union, as Kingdom of England, with the County of Anjou (1154–1204).
 Personal union, as Kingdom of England, with much of France (Angevin Empire) (1154–1214).
 Personal union, as Kingdom of England, with Aquitaine (1154–1453).
 Personal union, as Kingdom of England, with Principality of Wales (1284–1542).
 Personal union, as Kingdom of England, with Kingdom of France (1422–1453). See also: Dual monarchy of England and France.
 Personal union, as Kingdom of England, with Lordship of Ireland (1171–1542) and Kingdom of Ireland (1542–1649, 1660–1707).
 Personal union, as Kingdom of England, with Kingdom of Spain (1556–1558).
 Personal union, as Kingdom of England, with Kingdom of Scotland (1603–1649, 1660–1707).1
 Personal union, as Kingdom of England, with Principality of Orange (1689–1702).

1: After 1707, see Great Britain below.

France
 Personal union, as part of the Angevin Empire, with the Kingdom of England (1154–1214).
 Personal union with the Kingdom of England (1422–1453). See also: Dual monarchy of England and France.
 Personal union with the Kingdom of Naples under the rule of Charles VIII (1495) and Louis XII (1501–1504).
 Personal union with the Duchy of Milan under the rule of Louis XII (1499–1500 and 1500–1512) and Francis I (1515–1521 and 1524–1525).
 Personal union with the Kingdom of Scotland under the rule of Francis II (1559–1560).
 Personal union with the Polish–Lithuanian Commonwealth under the rule of Henry III (1574–1575).
 Personal union with the Kingdom of Navarre (1284–1328 and 1589–1620).
 Partial personal union with Andorra since 1607 (the French head of state is one of the heads of state in Andorra)
 Personal union under Napoleon with Italy and the Confederation of the Rhine.

Note: The point at issue in the War of the Spanish Succession was the fear that the succession to the Spanish throne dictated by Spanish law, which would devolve on Louis, le Grand Dauphin — already heir to the throne of France — would create a personal union that would upset the European balance of power; France had the most powerful military in Europe at the time, and Spain the largest empire.

Georgia
 Kingdom of Iberia and Colchis were connected power of the monarch in 300–90 years BC (Pharnavazid dynasty). 
 Kingdom of Pontus and Colchis were connected power of the monarch in 109 BC–64 AD.
 1000–1010 Kingdom of Abkhazia and Iberia ruled by Bagrat III. In 1010 it united (together with the annexed Kakheti kingdom) into a single Kingdom of Georgia.
Kingdom of Kakheti and Hereti were connected power of the monarch in 1020s–1104.
 Principality of Mingrelia and Principality of Abkhazia in the 1557–1660 years under the rule of the House of Dadiani
 Kingdom of Kartli and Kingdom of Kakheti united under the rule of a single monarch in 1513–1520 (David X), 1625–1633 (Teimuraz I), 1648–1658 (Rostom), 1660–1664 (Vakhtang V), 1723 (Constantine II/III), to finally unite the Kingdom of Kartli-Kakheti in 1762 under the reign of Heraclius II and his descendants.
 Kingdom of Imereti and Principality of Guria united under the rule of a single monarch in 1681–1683 (George IV/III), 1701–1702, 1713–1714 (Mamia (III)) and 1720 (George VIII/IV).

Great Britain
Before 1707, see England and Scotland.

 Personal union with Kingdom of Ireland (1707–1801).
 Personal union with Electorate of Hanover (1714–1801).

After 1801, see United Kingdom below.

Hanover 
 Personal union with Great Britain and Ireland from 1714 to 1801.
 Personal union with the United Kingdom from 1801 to 1807 and again from 1814 to 1837, when differing succession laws resulted in Queen Victoria ascending the British throne and her uncle Ernest Augustus that of Hanover.
 The personal union was interrupted from 1807 to 1813 when Hanover was merged into the Kingdom of Westphalia during the Napoleonic Wars. A few months after the Battle of Leipzig, the Kingdom of Hanover was re-established.

Holy Roman Empire
 Personal union with the Kingdom of Sicily from 1194 to 1254 under the Hohenstaufen dynasty.
 Personal union with Spain from 1519 to 1556 under Charles V.
 Personal union with Hungary 1410–1439, 1556–1608, 1612–1740 and 1780–1806.
 Personal union with Kingdom of Naples (1714–1735), Kingdom of Sardinia (1714–1720), Kingdom of Sicily (1720–1735)

Hungary
 Personal union with Poland and Bohemia 1301–1305.
 Personal union with Poland from 1370 to 1382 under the reign of Louis the Great. This period in Polish history is sometimes known as the Andegawen Poland. Louis inherited the Polish throne from his maternal uncle Casimir III. After Louis' death the Polish nobles (the szlachta) decided to end the personal union, since they did not want to be governed from Hungary, and chose Louis' younger daughter Jadwiga as their new ruler, while Hungary was inherited by his elder daughter Mary. Personal union with Poland for the second time from 1440 to 1444.
 Personal union with Naples from 1385 to 1386 under the reign of Charles III of Naples.  
 Personal union with Bohemia, 1419–1439 and 1490–1918.
 Personal union with the Archduchy of Austria, 1437–1439, 1444–1457, and 1526–1806.
 Personal union with the Holy Roman Empire, 1410–1439, 1556–1608, 1612–1740 and 1780–1806.
 Real union with Austria, 1867–1918 (the dual monarchy of Austria-Hungary) under the reigns of Franz Joseph and Charles IV.

Iceland
 Personal union with Denmark from 1918 to 1944, when the country became a republic.

Ireland
 Personal union, as Kingdom of Ireland, with the Kingdom of England (1542–1649 then again following the restoration 1660–1707).
 Personal union, as Kingdom of Ireland, with the Kingdom of Scotland (1603–1649 then again following the restoration 1660–1707).
 Personal union, as Kingdom of Ireland, with the Kingdom of Great Britain (1707–1801) 
 Personal union, as Irish Free State (1922–1937) then as Éire (1937–1949), with the United Kingdom of Great Britain and Northern Ireland. (The period 1937–1949 is disputed).

Italy
 Personal union with Kingdom of Albania (1939–1943).
Personal union with the Ethiopian Empire (1936–1941)

Lithuania
 Personal union (the Polish-Lithuanian Union) with the Crown of the Kingdom of Poland 1386–1401, 1447–1492 and 1501–1569; then transformed into a federation, Polish–Lithuanian Commonwealth.

Luxembourg
 Personal union with Bohemia, 1313–1378 and 1383–1388.
 Personal union with the Netherlands from 1815 to 1890, when King and Grand Duke William III died leaving only a daughter, Wilhelmina. Since Luxembourg held to Salic Law, Wilhelmina's distant cousin Adolphe succeeded to the Grand Duchy, ending the personal union.

Naples
 Personal union with Kingdom of Hungary from 1385 to 1386 under the rule of Charles II of Hungary.
 Personal union with Crown of Aragon (1442–1458 and 1504–1516).
 Personal union with Kingdom of France under the rule of Charles VIII (1495) and Louis XII (1501–1504).
 Personal union with Kingdom of Spain (1516–1714).
 Personal union with Holy Roman Empire (1714–1735).
 Personal union with Kingdom of Sicily from 1735 to 1806 under the rule of the House of Bourbon.

Navarre
 Personal union with France from 1285 to 1328 due to the marriage between Philip IV of France and Joan I of Navarre and the reign of their three sons, and from 1589 to 1620 due to the accession of Henry IV, after which Navarre was formally integrated into France.

Netherlands
 Personal union with Luxembourg from 1815 to 1890.

Norway
 Sweyn Forkbeard ruled both Norway and Denmark from 999 to 1014. He also ruled England from 1013 to 1014.
 Cnut the Great ruled both England and Denmark from 1018 to 1035. He also ruled Norway from 1028 to 1035.
 Personal union with Denmark 1042–1047. Magnus I of Norway ruled both Norway and Denmark, who died of unclear circumstances.
 Personal union with Sweden from 1319 to 1343.
 Personal union with Sweden from 1449 to 1450.
 Personal union with Denmark from 1380 to 1389/97.
 The Kalmar Union with Denmark and Sweden from 1389/97 to 1521/23 (sometimes defunct).
 Personal union with Denmark 1523 to 1814.
 Personal union with Sweden from 1814 (when Norway declared independence from Denmark and was forced into a union with Sweden) to 1905.

Poland

 Personal union with the Kingdom of Bohemia from 1300 to 1306.
 Personal union with the Kingdom of Hungary, 1301–1305, 1370–1382 and 1440–1444 (see Hungary section above).
 Personal union between the Duchy of Płock and Duchy of Wizna in 1345–1351, 1381–1382 and 1435–1495.
 Personal union with the Grand Duchy of Lithuania from 1386 to 1401, 1447 to 1492, and 1501 to 1569.
 Personal union with the Kingdom of France from 1574 to 1575.
 Personal union with the Kingdom of Sweden from 1592 to 1599.
 Personal union with the Duchy of Ruthenia (Ukraine) in 1658.
 Personal union with the Electorate of Saxony, 1697–1706, 1709–1733 and 1734–1763.
 Personal union with the Russian Empire from 1815 to 1831.

Pomerania
 Personal union between Pomerania-Stolp and Pomerania-Stargard from 1395 to 1402 and from 1403 to 1478.

Portugal
 Iberian Union with Spain from 1580 to 1640, under Philip II (also known as Philip I of Portugal), his son and grandson.
 Personal union with Brazil, under Peter I of Brazil (Peter IV of Portugal), from 10 March 1826 to 28 May 1826. Peter was the Prince Royal of Portugal, Brazil and the Algarves when he declared the independence of Brazil in 1822, becoming its first emperor. When his father (John VI of Portugal) died, Peter became also king of Portugal for only a few weeks, after which he abdicated the Portuguese throne in favor of his older daughter, Princess Maria da Glória.

Prussia
 Brandenburg-Prussia: personal union between the Margraviate of Brandenburg and Duchy of Prussia (1618–1701).
 Personal union between Kingdom of Prussia and Duchy of Courland and Semigallia (later United Baltic Duchy) (1918).
 Personal union between Kingdom of Prussia and Principality of Neuchâtel, 1707–1806 and 1814–1848. The King of Prussia exchanged territories with France during the 1806–1814 interim.
 Personal union between Kingdom of Prussia and the German Empire, 1871–1918.

Romania
 Personal union between Wallachia and Moldavia from 1859 to 1862 under the rule of Alexandru Ioan Cuza

Russia
 Personal union between the Russian Empire and the Lordship of Jever from 1793 to 1818

Sardinia
 Personal union with Kingdom of Spain (1516–1708).
 Personal union with Holy Roman Empire (1714–1720).
 Personal union with Duchy of Savoy from 1720.

Saxe-Coburg and Saxe-Gotha

In 1826, the newly created Duchy of Saxe-Coburg and Gotha was initially a double duchy, ruled by Duke Ernest I in a personal union. In 1852, the duchies were bound in a political and real union. They were then a quasi-federal unitary state, even though later attempts to merge the duchies failed.

Saxe-Weimar and Saxe-Eisenach
The duchies of Saxe-Weimar and Saxe-Eisenach were in personal union from 1741, when the ruling house of Saxe-Eisenach died out, until 1809, when they were merged into the single duchy of Saxe-Weimar-Eisenach.

Schleswig and Holstein
Duchies with peculiar rules for succession. See the Schleswig-Holstein Question.

The kings of Denmark at the same time being dukes of Schleswig and Holstein 1460–1864. (Holstein being part of the Holy Roman Empire, while Schleswig was a part of Denmark). The situation was complicated by the fact that for some time, the Duchies were divided among collateral branches of the House of Oldenburg (the ruling House in Denmark and Schleswig-Holstein). Besides the "main" Duchy of Schleswig-Holstein-Glückstadt, ruled by the Kings of Denmark, there were states encompassing territory in both Duchies. Notably the Dukes of Schleswig-Holstein-Gottorp and the subordinate Dukes of Schleswig-Holstein-Beck, Schleswig-Holstein-Sonderburg-Augustenburg and Schleswig-Holstein-Sonderburg-Glücksburg.

Schwarzburg-Rudolstadt and Schwarzburg-Sondershausen
The duchies of Schwarzburg-Rudolstadt and Schwarzburg-Sondershausen were in personal union from 1909, when Prince Günther of Schwarzburg-Rudolstadt succeeded also to the throne of Schwarzburg-Sondershausen, until 1918, when he (and all the other German monarchs) abdicated.

Scotland
 Personal union, as Kingdom of Scotland, with the Kingdom of France during the reign of Francis II (1559–1560), first husband of Mary, Queen of Scots.
 Personal union, as Kingdom of Scotland, with the Kingdom of England and Kingdom of Ireland (1603–1707) following the accession of James VI, King of Scots, to the joint English and Irish throne. (All monarchs of Scotland were in a personal union with England and Ireland throughout the period 1603–1707, with the exception of Charles II, reigning solely as King of Scots 1649–1651, and the subsequent interregnum between 1651 and restoration of the House of Stuart in 1660)1
 Personal union, as Kingdom of Scotland, with the Dutch Republic (1689–1702) during the reign of William II of Scotland.

1: After 1707, see Great Britain above. After 1801, see United Kingdom below.

Sicily
 Union (or Personal Union) with the Holy Roman Empire from 1194 to 1254 under the rule of the House of Hohenstaufen.
 Personal union with the Crown of Aragon from 1282 to 1285 and 1409 to 1516 under the rule of the House of Barcelona and the House of Trastámara.
 Personal union with the Kingdom of Spain from 1516 to 1713 under the rule of the House of Habsburg and the House of Bourbon.
 Personal union with the Duchy of Savoy from 1713 to 1720 under the rule of Victor Amadeus II of Savoy.
 Personal union with the Holy Roman Empire from 1720 to 1734 under the rule of Charles VI of Habsburg.
 Personal union with the Kingdom of Naples from 1735 to 1806 under the rule of the House of Bourbon.

Spain 
Leon, Castile and Aragon
 Kingdom of León, Kingdom of Galicia and Kingdom of Asturias (914–924).
 Kingdom of León and Kingdom of Castile (1037–1065 and 1072–1230).
 Crown of Aragon and Kingdom of Navarre (1076–1134).
 Crown of Aragon and Kingdom of Sicily (1412–1516).
 Crown of Aragon and Kingdom of Naples (1442–1458 and 1504–1516).
 Crown of Castile and Duchy of Burgundy (1506).
 Crown of Castile and Crown of Aragon from 1516 to 1715, during Habsburg Spain and until the Nueva Planta decrees (1707–1715) annexed the different territories of the Crown of Aragon to the Crown of Castile, converting Spain into a real union.

Spain
 Personal union with Archduchy of Austria and Austrian dynastic lands (1519–1521).
 Personal union with Holy Roman Empire (1519–1556) under Charles I.
 Personal union with Kingdom of Naples (1516–1714), Kingdom of Sardinia (1516–1708), Kingdom of Sicily (1516–1713) and Duchy of Milan (1540–1706).
 Personal union with Habsburg Netherlands (1516–1581) and Spanish Netherlands (1581–1714).
 Personal union with Kingdom of England (1556–1558).
 Personal union (Iberian Union) with Kingdom of Portugal (1580–1640).

Sweden

 Personal union with Norway from 1319 to 1343.
 Personal union with Scania from 1332 to 1360.
 The Kalmar Union with Denmark and Norway from 1389/97 to 1521/23 (sometimes defunct).
 Personal union with Norway from 1449 to 1450.
 Personal union with the Crown of the Kingdom of Poland from 1592 to 1599.
 Swedish kings united their kingdom with Estonia (1581–1721), Livonia (1629–1721), Karelia (1617–1721), Scania (1645–1721), Bremen-Verden (1648–1719), Pomerania (1630–1815), Wismar (1648–1803) and Ingria (1583–1595 and 1617–1721).
 Personal union with Norway from 1814 to 1905.

United Kingdom
 Personal union with the Electorate of Hanover (1801–1806).
 Personal union with the Kingdom of Hanover (1814–1837).
 Personal union with the Irish Free State (1922–1937) and Ireland (de jure) from 1937 to 1949; 
 The former Dominions and Commonwealth realms: 
Newfoundland (1907–1934),
South Africa (1910–1961),
India (1947–1950),
Pakistan (1947–1956),
Ceylon (now Sri Lanka; 1948–1972),
Ghana (1957–1960),
Nigeria (1960–1963),
Sierra Leone (1961–1971),
Tanganyika (1961–1962),
Trinidad and Tobago (1962–1976),
Uganda (1962–1963),
Kenya (1963–1964),
Malawi (1964–1966),
Malta (1964–1974),
The Gambia (1965–1970),
Guyana (1966–1970),
Mauritius (1968–1992),
Fiji (1970–1987),
Barbados (1966–2021).
 Personal union with the current Commonwealth realms: 
Canada since 1867,
Australia since 1901,
New Zealand since 1907,
Jamaica since 1962,
The Bahamas since 1973,
Grenada since 1974,
Papua New Guinea since 1975,
Solomon Islands since 1978,
Tuvalu since 1978,
Saint Lucia since 1979,
Saint Vincent and the Grenadines since 1979,
Antigua and Barbuda since 1981,
Belize since 1981,
Saint Kitts and Nevis since 1983.

Wales
 Personal union, as Principality of Wales, with Kingdom of England (1284–1542).

After 1542, see England above.

Republics in personal union
Because heads of state and government of republics are ordinarily chosen from within the citizens of the state in question, sovereign republics rarely share common leaders. However, there have been exceptions over time:

 Uniquely, the President of France is ex-officio a constitutional monarch (or, more accurately, diarch) in neighboring Andorra, with the title of Co-Prince. This status was inherited from the role of the French monarchs in Andorra.
 During the later stages of the Spanish American Wars of Independence, Simón Bolívar was simultaneously President of Gran Colombia (24 February 1819-4 May 1830), President of Peru (10 February 1824–28 January 1827), and President of Bolivia (12 August 1825-29 December 1825). Bolívar had as President and military Commander-in-Chief of Colombia led a Colombian army to secure Peruvian independence in 1824-25, and was given the office of President by the Patriot republican governments of both Peru and Bolivia (renamed in his honor from "Upper Peru") as an emergency measure to help secure independence from Spain. After the end of the war, Bolívar relinquished his Peruvian and Bolivian offices and returned to Colombia.
 In 1860 Marthinus Wessel Pretorius was simultaneously elected as the president of Transvaal and Orange Free State. He tried to unify the two countries, but his efforts failed, leading to the Transvaal Civil War.

See also 
Composite monarchy
Confederation
Dynastic union
King-Emperor
Political union
Dual mandate

Notes

References 

Political systems